The Giving You the Best Tour was a world concert tour in 1988 by American recording artist Anita Baker. Following the release of her multi-platinum selling album, Giving You the Best That I Got,  Baker toured in support of the album's release. The tour kicked off on September 10, in Boston, Massachusetts, with dates scheduled in North America, Europe, Asia and additional dates added for a North American second leg outing.

Some select dates included a co-headlining outing with R&B singer Luther Vandross, in October, November and December. Baker's itinerary included four consecutive dates in various cities in the US, which included New York City, Chicago, and Los Angeles.

Set list
"Sweet Love"
"Been So Long"
"No One in the World"
"Mystery"
"Same Ole Love (365 Days of Year)"
"Good Love"
"I’m The One" (performed by Perri Sisters)
"Lead Me Into Love"
"Angel" 1
"Watch Your Step"
"God Bless the Child" 2
"Priceless"
"Another Part of Me"
"No More Tears" 2
"Just Because"
"Good Enough" 2
"You Bring Me Joy"
Encore
"Caught Up in the Rapture"
"Giving You the Best That I Got"

Notes
1 performed only on selected dates in North America.2 only performed at selected dates in Europe and North America.

Band
 Musical director/guitar: Ray Fuller
 Keyboards: Darrell Smith
 Drums: Rayford Griffin
 Bass: Sekou Bunch
 Percussions: Bill Summers
 Saxophone: Everette Harp
 Keyboards: Donn Wyatt
 Background vocals: Perri Sisters (Lori, Darlene, Carol, Sharon), Gina Taylor

Tour dates

Additional notes
 Not all Europe and North America dates in 1988 and 1989 are listed.
 Baker shared co-headlining dates with singer Luther Vandross, only on selected dates in October, November and December. Concert promotional dates was billed as, 'The Heat: Luther & Anita Tour'.

Broadcast and recordings
 Baker's concert on October 21, 1988 in London at the Wembley Arena was broadcast live on BBC Radio London.

References

External links
 AnitaBaker.com

1988 concert tours
Anita Baker concert tours